The Supreme Court of Victoria is the highest court in the Australian state of Victoria. Founded in 1852, it is a superior court of common law and equity, with unlimited and inherent jurisdiction within the state.

The Supreme Court comprises two divisions: the Trial Division, which oversees its original jurisdiction, and the Court of Appeal, which deals with its appellate jurisdiction, and is frequently referred to as a court in its own right. Although the Supreme Court is theoretically vested with unlimited jurisdiction, it generally only hears, at trial, criminal cases in instances of murder, manslaughter or treason, and civil cases where the statement of claim is in excess of the Magistrates' Court limit of $100,000. 

The court hears appeals from the County Court, as well as limited appeals from the Magistrates' Court. Decisions of the Supreme Court are appealable to the High Court of Australia.

The building itself is on the Victorian Heritage Register.

Jurisdiction 

The Supreme Court has two divisions - the Trial Division and the Court of Appeal.

Trial Division
The Trial Division sits with one judge, and usually acts as a court of original jurisdiction for serious criminal matters such as murder, attempted murder, corporate offences and certain conspiracy charges, and civil matters which are considered to involve greater complexity or amounts of money more than would be appropriate to have determined in the Magistrates' Court (whose civil jurisdictional limit is $100,000) or County Court (whose jurisdiction has since the beginning of 2007 been unlimited as to amount). The Trial Division also acts as an appeal court from the Magistrates' Court on questions of law, and appeals from the Victorian Civil and Administrative Tribunal on points of law, except against an order of the President or Vice-President of the Tribunal. It also hears federal indictable offences such as treason.

The Commercial Court is a sub-division of the Trial Division, composed of specialist judges to deal with commercial disputes.

Court of Appeal
The Court of Appeal hears appeals from the County Court and the Trial Division, as well as appeals on points of law from the Victorian Civil and Administrative Tribunal against the order of the President or Vice-President, and usually consists of a panel of three Judges of Appeal. In rare cases where it is sought to overrule or reconsider the correctness of a previous Court of Appeal decision, it can sit with five judges.

Locations

The main buildings for the Supreme Court are located at the corner of William and Lonsdale Streets in Melbourne and in nearby buildings.

The Supreme Court also does circuits to Ballarat, Geelong, Warrnambool, Hamilton, Horsham, Bendigo, Mildura, Shepparton, Wangaratta, Wodonga, Sale and Morwell. In these locations the Court uses the facilities of the local Magistrates' Court.

Current judges 
(appointment date in brackets):

Chief Justice
 Anne Ferguson (Trial Division from 3 May 2010; Court of Appeal from 12 August 2014)

President of the Court of Appeal
 Karin Emerton (Trial Division from 13 October 2009; Court of Appeal from 10 July 2018; 16 July 2022)

Judges of the Court of Appeal
 Phillip Priest (23 October 2012)
 David Beach (Trial Division from 5 September 2008; 22 October 2013)
 Emilios Kyrou (Trial Division from 15 May 2008; 29 July 2014)
 Stephen Kaye (Trial Division from 2003; 3 February 2015)
 Stephen McLeish (5 March 2015)
 Richard Niall (28 November 2017)
 Terry Forrest (Trial Division from 13 October 2009; 10 July 2018)
 Michael Sifris (Trial Division from 19 July 2010; 2 June 2020)
 Maree Kennedy (Trial Division from 25 July 2016; 15 December 2020)
 Kristen Walker (3 May 2021)
 Cameron Macaulay (Trial Division from 2010; 1 February 2022)

Judges of the Trial Division
 Elizabeth Hollingworth (7 June 2004)
 Anthony Cavanough (8 May 2006)
 John Dixon (16 September 2010)
 Cameron Macaulay (22 September 2010)
 Kate McMillan (8 March 2012)
 Geoffrey John Digby (19 November 2012)
 James Dudley Elliott (25 March 2013) 
 Timothy James Ginnane (4 June 2013)
 Melanie Sloss (30 July 2013)
 Michael Croucher (30 July 2013)
 Christopher William Beale (2 September 2014) 
 Michael Phillip McDonald (16 September 2014) 
 Rita Incerti (3 February 2015) 
 Peter Julian Riordan (10 March 2015) 
 Jane Dixon (17 August 2015)
 Andrew John Keogh (4 April 2016)
 Peter Barrington Kidd (24 May 2016)
 Michelle Quigley (19 December 2017)
 Matthew Connock (10 April 2018)
 Melinda Richards (24 April 2018)
 Kevin Lyons (22 May 2018)
 Lesley Taylor (10 July 2018)
 Steven Moore (10 July 2018)
 Andrew Tinney (10 July 2018)
 Jacinta Forbes (16 April 2019)
 Lisa Nichols (22 October 2019)
 Christopher James Delany (2 June 2020)
 Kathryn Stynes (22 June 2020)
 James Gorton (15 December 2020)
 Michael Osborne (15 December 2020)
Stephen O'Meara (18 May 2021)
Richard Attiwill (18 May 2021)

See also
 Judiciary of Australia
 List of Judges of the Supreme Court of Victoria
 List of Victorian Supreme Court cases
Supreme Court of Victoria (Building)

References

Notes

External links
 Official Supreme Court of Victoria website
 Judges - Historic List
 Supreme Court Act (The Act which governs the Supreme Court) (pdf 459kb)

 
Victoria (Australia) courts and tribunals
1852 establishments in Australia
Courts and tribunals established in 1852